Council High School (CHS) is a high school in Council, Idaho, United States.
Council High School is a school with a rich academic and athletic history. It has an FFA Chapter, FCCLA Chapter, SADD Chapter, and Honor Society Chapter. CHS also has many sports Football, Cross Country, Volleyball, Basketball, and Track & Field. It is a small school with a lot of school spirit. The Lumber Yard (the student section) is always the loudest crowd in the gym. Its school rival is Tri-Valley. To help the local forests, Council High grows native plants for the Forest Service and their own RAC Crew. It also has community service contests to encourage helping the community. The students of CHS frequently head across the field to the Elementary. There they help future CHS students improve their reading ability.

CHS is proud of its recycling programs, which reduced waste from two dumpsters to just three trash cans. In addition to that, Council uses a wood biomass burner for heating. This utilizes the wood chip waste from the local timber industry to heat the Elementary and High School.

References

Public high schools in Idaho
Schools in Adams County, Idaho